A civil service commission is a government agency that is constituted by legislature to regulate the employment and working conditions of civil servants, oversee hiring and promotions, and promote the values of the public service. Its role is roughly analogous to that of the human resources department in corporations. Civil service commissions are often independent from elected politicians.

In Fiji for example, the PSC reviews government statutory powers to ensure efficiency and effectiveness in meeting public sector management objectives. It also acts as the human relations department, or central personnel authority, for the citizens' interactions with the government.

The origin of the public service commission in many jurisdictions was the White Paper Colonial 197 issued in 1950, which set out measures which were proposed to improve the quality and efficiency of the Colonial Service of the British administration. The setting up of public service commissions was proposed in its paragraph 21(xi) which mentioned that:

and that:

National public service commissions
  Afghanistan: Independent Administrative Reform and Civil Service Commission
  Australian Public Service Commission
  Bangladesh Public Service Commission
  Bhutan: Royal Civil Service Commission
  Brunei Public Service Commission
  Public Service Commission of Canada
  Taiwan: Examination Yuan of the Republic of China
  Fiji Public Service Commission
  Hong Kong Public Service Commission
 : Union Public Service Commission
 : National Civil Service Agency
  Ireland: Office of the Civil Service and Local Appointments Commissioners abolished 2004; succeeded by:
Commission for Public Service Appointments
Public Appointments Service
 : 
  Kenya Public Service Commission
  Malaysia Public Service Commission (Suruhanjaya Perkhidmatan Awam)
  Mauritius Public Service Commission
  Myanmar: Union Civil Service Board
 : Public Service Commission
  Nigeria: 
Federal Civil Service Commission
Rivers State Civil Service Commission
 : Federal Public Service Commission
  Philippines: Civil Service Commission
  Samoa Public Service Commission
  Sri Lanka Public Service Commission
  Somaliland Civil Service Commission
  South Africa Public Service Commission
 : Public Service Commission
 : Civil Service Commission
 :
 United States Civil Service Commission (defunct)
 Office of Personnel Management (current)
 Merit Systems Protection Board (current)
  Zimbabwe Public Service Commission

See also 
:Category:National civil service commissions – articles for national civil service commissions
Public utilities commission (some government utilities regulation agencies are called public service commissions)

References 

+